The Cincinnati Commandos were a professional indoor football team based in Cincinnati, Ohio. The team suspended operations for the 2013 season, with hope of returning in 2014. They began play in 2010 as an expansion team in the Continental Indoor Football League before moving to the United Indoor Football League in 2012. The Commandos then left the UIFL after winning Ultimate Bowl II and re-joined the CIFL, but never took the field after its announcement. The Commandos were the fifth arena or indoor football in Cincinnati, after the Cincinnati Rockers (Arena Football League 1992–93), Cincinnati Swarm (af2 2003), Cincinnati Marshals (National Indoor Football League 2004–2006), and Cincinnati Jungle Kats (af2 2007). The owners of the Commandos are Dennis Whitman and Paul Napier. The Commandos played their home games at Cincinnati Gardens.

Franchise history

Play begins: 2010

The Commandos posted a 9-1 regular season mark in the 2010 season, winning their first nine games before losing the final one at Wisconsin. After a three-week break, Cincinnati defeated Miami Valley, 48-24, in the CIFL Semifinals, and then defeated the Wisconsin Wolfpack, 54-40 in the 2010 CIFL Championship Game, on June 26, to claim Cincinnati's first ever professional football championship.

2011

Head Coach Billy Back returned for the 2011 season, Brian Wells, former head coach of the Miami Valley Silverbacks, was hired as assistant head coach / special teams coordinator / offensive line coach.  For 2011 the Commandos have announced the signing of: Tyler Sheehan (QB), Derrick Crawford (defensive line), Maurice Lee (WR), Corey Clarke (WR), Brandon Harrison (WR), and Peter Warrick (WR) Cincinnati opened up defense of its 2010 CIFL Championship with a convincing 53-7 victory over Chicago on March 5. Cincinnati unveiled its championship banner at The Gardens that same night and gave its fans a memorable evening. Cincinnati dominated the game from start to finish jumping out to 21-0 lead and 27-7 halftime lead. Cincinnati scored just once in the third quarter before adding three more scores in the final stanza. Cincinnati was led by two quarterbacks. Starting quarterback Tyler Sheehan was 11 of 20 for 135 yards and two touchdowns. Fellow quarterback and 2010 CIFL MVP Ben Mauk was nine of 15 for 102 yards and four touchdowns. The passing was spread around to seven receivers. The top receiver was Keynes Mincy with six receptions for 64 yards and two touchdowns. Other receivers include Brandon Boehm wo had three catches for 50 yards; George Murray had four receptions for 44 yards; and Greg Moore had two catches for 35 yards. The leading rusher was Greg Moore with 24 yards on nine carries. On March 19, quarterback Tyler Sheehan broke a Commandos record, by throwing 8 touchdown passes against the Indianapolis Enforcers. The previous record had been 7, which Mauk achieved twice in the 2010 season. On May 29, 2011, the Commandos completed their first ever undefeated regular season, with a 50-20 win over the Marion Blue Racers, in what was a battle for first place and home field advantage throughout the CIFL Playoffs. Once again, the season ended with the Commandos as CIFL Champions, defeating the Blue Racers 44-29.

2012

After an initial report that stated the Commandos would join the Stadius Football Association, on July 11, 2011, the Commandos announced they were leaving the CIFL to join the Ultimate Indoor Football League. On August 23, 2011, it was announced that Bill Back would return as head coach for a 3rd season with the Commandos On July 2, 2012, the Commandos completed their third straight league championship, defeating the Florida Tarpons 62-44 in the UIFL's Ultimate Bowl II.  The Commandos had won the CIFL Championship the previous two seasons.

2013
The Commandos left the UIFL after winning its third championship in a row. On August 3, 2012, they re-joined the CIFL. In September 2012, head coach Billy Back told the Commandos that he was not returning to pursue a higher level coaching position in professional football. The team named receivers coach, and former Arena Football League receiver, J.C. Baker as Back's replacement. In November 2012, the Commandos announced that they would suspend operations for the 2013 season, and re-organize for their future success. However, seeing as though ownership thought they could not win with anyone other than Back, the team never returned and disappeared.

Statistics

Season-by-season results

Head coaches' records

Players

Final roster

Awards and honors
The following is a list of all Commandos players who have won league awards:

Other notable former players

 Rayshawn Askew - RB
 Maurice Lee - WR
 Robert Redd - WR/DB
 Khalil El-Amin - OL
 Chris Respress - DB
 E.J. Underwood - DB

Staff

References

External links
Cincinnati Commandos official website

American football teams in Cincinnati
Former Ultimate Indoor Football League teams
Former Continental Indoor Football League teams
Defunct American football teams in Ohio
American football teams established in 2010
American football teams disestablished in 2013
2010 establishments in Ohio
2013 disestablishments in Ohio